BC Lokomotiv Sofia are a Bulgarian basketball club based in the capital Sofia and part of the Lokomotiv Sofia sports club.

Lokomotiv Sofia have been 6 times champions of Bulgaria and 2 times Bulgarian cup winners. They play their home games at Lokomotiv Hall in Sofia. In 2002 the men's and women's basketball teams were disbanded  due to financial difficulties. In 2014 teams was restored and 5 years latter girls and boys from Lokomotiv are one of the best teams in U12, U13, U14 divisions.
In 2020 the men's basketball team was restored.

Honours
  Bulgarian Championships: (6)  1943, 1948, 1955, 1961, 1964, 1966
  Bulgarian Cup: (2) 1956,1966

History
In 1967 Lokomotiv achieved one of the biggest international victory in Bulgarian basketball by defeating a three-digit score Real (Madrid).

See also
 WBC Lokomotiv Sofia

External links
 News for BC Lokomotiv Sofia in Bulgarian at lokosf.info

Basketball teams in Bulgaria
Lokomotiv Sofia